Guillaume Côté  (born September 17, 1981) is a Canadian ballet dancer and choreographer. He is currently a principal dancer and a Choreographic Associate at the National Ballet of Canada.

Early life
Côté was born in Lac Saint-Jean, Quebec. Both of his parents are schoolteachers, who invited a teacher to start a ballet school in Lac Saint-Jean. Côté, his sister and several cousins started ballet at that school. At age 11, despite not speaking English, he entered Canada's National Ballet School in Toronto.

Career
In 1998, at age 17, Côté joined the National Ballet of Canada as an apprentice. At age 19, he made his debut as Prince Siegfried in Swan Lake, making him the youngest person in the company to dance that role. In 2001, he danced Romeo and Romeo and Juliet. In 2004, at age 23, Côté became a principal dancer. His repertoire include The Sleeping Beauty and Nijinsky. He had originated the role Romeo in Alexei Ratmansky's version of Romeo and Juliet. Côté celebrated his 20th anniversary at the National Ballet in 2019, after a performance of Apollo.

As a guest artist, Côté had performed with La Scala Theatre Ballet, English National Ballet, The Royal Ballet, American Ballet Theatre, The Hamburg Ballet and Stuttgart Ballet, as well as in Kings of the Dance,  The Vision of Manuel Legris and Roberto Bolle and Friends. With English National Ballet, he originated the role of Gene Kelly in Strictly Gershwin. In 2018, Côté made a guest appearance in Bolshoi Ballet in Moscow, making him the first dancer from Quebec and one of the few Canadians to have danced in Bolshoi. In 2020, he made his debut at the New York City Ballet, dancing Swan Lake with Sara Mearns, in order to replace an injured Tyler Angle.

Côté was appointed Choreographic Associate of the National Ballet in 2013. He had choreographed a number of one-act ballet for the company. He won the Audience Choice Award at the Erik Bruhn Prize for Enkeli, received the third prize at Ballet Society Hanover’s 25th International Competition for #24. He had also choreographed and starred in short film Lost in Motion, and its sequel, Lost in Motion II. His first full-length work, Le Petit Prince, based on the novella of the same name, premiered in 2016. He collaborated with set designer Michael Levine and composer Kevin Lau, and consulted Antoine de Saint-Exupéry  authority Adam Gopnik for Le Petit Prince. Côté had also choreographed for Olympic-winning ice dancing duo Tessa Virtue and Scott Moir.

In 2014, Côté became the artist director of Festival des Arts de Saint-Sauveur, a dance festival in Quebec. He was made a Knight of the National Order of Quebec in 2020.

Personal life
In 2010, Côté married fellow National Ballet principal dancer Heather Ogden. The couple has two children.

Côté grew up playing piano, clarinet and classical guitar. In later years, he learned to play cello and studies composition at The Royal Conservatory of Music

External links
Interview with Guillaume Côté and Heather Ogden by The Poetry Extension

References

Living people
Canadian male ballet dancers
National Ballet of Canada principal dancers
People from Saguenay–Lac-Saint-Jean
21st-century ballet dancers
1981 births